The Molière Award recognises achievement in live French theatre and is the national theatre award of France.
The Molière Awards are considered the highest French theatre honour. The awards are presented and decided by the Association professionnelle et artistique du théâtre (APAT) and supported by the Ministry of Culture at an annual ceremony, called the Nuit des Molières ("Night of the Molières") in Paris. The awards are given for French productions and performances.

The Molière Awards are considered the highest French theatre honour, the equivalent to the American Tony Award, the British Olivier Award and the Spanish Premios Max. The award was created by Georges Cravenne, who was also the creator of the César Award for cinema.  The name of the award is an homage to the seventeenth-century French dramatist Molière.

Awards by year and category

1987
Jury presided by Jean-Louis Barrault.  Awards hosted by François Périer.
Best Actor - Philippe Clévenot, in Elvire Jouvet 40
Best Supporting Actor - Pierre Arditi, in La Répétition ou l'Amour puni (The Rehearsal)
Best Male Newcomer - Philippe Caubère, in Ariane ou l'Âge d'or
Best Actress - Suzanne Flon, in Léopold le bien aimé
Best Supporting Actress - Sabine Haudepin, in Kean
Best Female Newcomer - Ute Lemper, in Cabaret
Best Show in an Independent theatre - Ariane ou l'Âge d'or, at the Théâtre des Arts/Théâtre Tristan-Bernard
Best Show in a National theatre - La Folle Journée ou le Mariage de Figaro (The Marriage of Figaro), at the Théâtre national de Chaillot
Best Musical - Cabaret, at the Théâtre du 8ème (Lyon)
Best Adaptation of a Foreign Play - Jean-Loup Dabadie, for Deux sur la balançoire (Two for the Seesaw)
Best Playwright - Yasmina Reza, for Conversations après un enterrement (Conversations After a Burial)
Best Director - Jean-Pierre Vincent, for La Folle Journée ou le Mariage de Figaro (The Marriage of Figaro)
Best Costumes - Yannis Kokkos, for Madame de Sade
Best Stage Design/Set - Yannis Kokkos, for L'Échange

1988
Jury presided by.  Awards hosted by.
Best Actor - Jacques Dufilho in Je ne suis pas Rappaport
Best Supporting Actor - Pierre Vaneck in Le Secret (The Secret)
Best Actress - Jeanne Moreau in Le Récit de la servante Zerline (Zerline's Tale)
Best Supporting Actress - Catherine Salviat in Dialogue des carmélites (Dialogues of the Carmelites)
Best Newcomer - Thierry Fortineau in Journal d'un curé de campagne (Diary of a Country Priest)
Best Show in an Independent theatre - Ce que voit Fox (Fall) at the Théâtre La Bruyère
Best Show in a National theatre - Le Soulier de satin (The Satin Slipper) at the Théâtre national de Chaillot
Best Musical - Les Petits Pas at the Théâtre des Bouffes du Nord
Best Adaptation of a Foreign Play - Jean-Claude Grumberg for Mort d'un commis voyageur (Death of a Salesman)
Best Playwright - Loleh Bellon for L'Éloignement
Best Director - Laurent Terzieff for Ce que voit Fox (Fall)
Best Costumes - Jacques Schmidt for Georges Dandin
Best Stage Design/Set - Ezio Frigerio for George Dandin

1989
Jury presided by.  Awards hosted by.
Best Actor - Gérard Desarthe in Hamlet
Best Supporting Actor - Étienne Chicot in Une absence
Best Actress - María Casares in Hécube (Hecuba)
Best Supporting Actress - Christine Murillo in La Mouette (The Seagull)
Best Newcomer - Elisabeth Maccoco in Callas (Master Class)
Best Show in an Independent theatre - L'Avare (The Miser) at the Théâtre du Marais
Best Show in a National theatre - Le Foyer at the Théâtre de la Plaine
Best Musical - Cats at the Théâtre de Paris
Best Adaptation of a Foreign Play - Dominique Deschamps for Je ne suis pas Rappaport (I'm Not Rappaport)
Best Playwright - François Billetdoux for Réveille-toi Philadelphie !
Best Director - Patrice Chéreau for Hamlet
Best Costumes - Jacques Schmidt for Hamlet
Best Stage Design/Set - Richard Peduzzi for Hamlet

1990
Jury presided by.  Awards hosted by.
Best Actor - Pierre Dux in Quelque part dans cette vie
Best Supporting Actor - Michel Robin in La Traversée de l'hiver (The Passage of Winter)
Best Actress - Denise Gence in Avant la retraite
Best Supporting Actress - Judith Magre in Greek
Best Newcomer - Redjep Mitrovitsa in Lorenzaccio
Best Show in an Independent theatre - Les Palmes de Monsieur Schutz at the Théâtre des Mathurins
Best Show in a National theatre - Greek at the Théâtre national de la Colline
Best Musical - Tempo at the Théâtre Fontaine
Best Adaptation of a Foreign Play - Michel Butel for Le Chemin solitaire
Best Playwright - Jean-Noël Fenwick for Les Palmes de Monsieur Schutz
Best Director - Gérard Caillaud for Les Palmes de Monsieur Schutz
Best Costumes - Patrice Cauchetier for La Mère coupable ou l'Autre Tartuffe
Best Stage Design/Set - Jacques Voizot for Les Palmes de Monsieur Schutz
Best Fringe Production - Yasmina Reza for La Traversée de l'hiver (The Passage of Winter)

1991
Jury presided by.  Awards hosted by.
Best Actor - Guy Tréjan in Heldenplatz
Best Supporting Actor - Jean-Paul Roussillon in Zone libre
Best Actress - Dominique Valadié in La Dame de chez Maxim (The Girl from Maxim's)
Best Supporting Actress - Catherine Arditi in A croquer... ou l'ivre de cuisine
Best Female Newcomer - Sophie Marceau in Eurydice
Best Show in an Independent theatre - Le Souper at the Théâtre Montparnasse
Best Show in a National theatre - La Tempête at the Théâtre des Bouffes du Nord
Best Musical - Christophe Colomb at the TLP Dejazet
Best Adaptation of a Foreign Play - Jean-Claude Carrière for La Tempête (The Tempest)
Best Playwright - Jean-Claude Grumberg for Zone libre
Best Director - Peter Brook for La Tempête (The Tempest)
Best Costumes - Dominique Borg for La Cerisaie (The Cherry Orchard)
Best Stage Design/Set - Louis Bercut for Heldenplatz

1992
Jury presided by.  Awards hosted by.
Best Actor - Henri Virlogeux in L'Antichambre
Best Supporting Actor - Robert Hirsch in Le Misanthrope
Best Actress - Ludmila Mikaël in Célimène et le Cardinal
Best Supporting Actress - Danièle Lebrun in Le Misanthrope
Best Newcomer - Stéphane Freiss in C'était bien
Best Show in an Independent theatre - Cuisine et dépendances at the Théâtre La Bruyère
Best Show in a National theatre - Le Temps et la chambre at the Théâtre de l'Odéon
Best Musical - Les Misérables at the Théâtre Mogador
Best Adaptation of a Foreign Play - Jean Poiret for Sans rancune
Best Playwright - Agnès Jaoui and Jean-Pierre Bacri for Cuisine et dépendances
Best Director - Stéphan Meldegg for Cuisine et dépendances
Best Costumes - Bernadette Villard for Célimène et le Cardinal
Best Stage Design/Set - Nicolas Sire for Célimène et le Cardinal

1993
Jury presided by.  Awards hosted by.
Best Actor - Michel Aumont in Macbett
Best Supporting Actor - Jean-Pierre Sentier in L'Eglise
Best Actress - Edwige Feuillère in Edwige Feuillère en scène
Best Supporting Actress - Françoise Bertin in Temps contre temps
Best Newcomer - Emmanuelle Laborit in Les Enfants du silence
Best Show in an Independent theatre - Temps contre temps at the Théâtre La Bruyère
Best Show in a National theatre - La Serva amorosa at the Comédie-Française
Best Musical - Mortadella at the Théâtre Montparnasse and La Cigale
Best Adaptation of a Foreign Play - Jean Dalric and Jacques Collard for Les Enfants du silence
Best Playwright - René de Obaldia for Monsieur Klebs et Rozalie
Best Director - Laurent Terzieff for Temps contre temps (Another Time)
Best Costumes - Nicole Galerne for Légende de la forêt viennoise
Best Stage Design/Set - Nicky Rieri for Légende de la forêt viennoise

1994
Jury presided by.  Awards hosted by.
Best Actor - Jean-Pierre Marielle in Le Retour (The Homecoming)
Best Supporting Actor - Roland Blanche in La Résistible ascension d'Arturo Ui (The Resistible Rise of Arturo Ui)
Best Actress - Tsilla Chelton in Les Chaises (The Chairs)
Best Supporting Actress - Annick Alane in Tailleur pour dames
Best Newcomer - Éric-Emmanuel Schmitt (Playwright) for Le Visiteur (The Visitor)
Best Show in an Independent theatre - Le Visiteur (The Visitor) at the Théâtre de Paris
Best Show in a National theatre - Comment va le monde, Môssieu ? Il tourne, Môssieu ! at the Théâtre national de la Colline
Best Musical - Le Quatuor at the Théâtre Dejazet
Best Adaptation of a Foreign Play - Attica Guedj and Stéphan Meldegg for L'Ampoule magique (The Floating Light Bulb)
Best Playwright - Éric-Emmanuel Schmitt for Le Libertin (The Libertine)
Best Director - Benno Besson for Quisaitout et Grobêta
Best Costumes - Jean-Marc Stehlé for Quisaitout et Grobêta
Best Stage Design/Set - Jean-Marc Stehlé for Quisaitout et Grobêta

1995
Jury presided by.  Awards hosted by.
Best Actor - Pierre Meyrand in Les Affaires sont les affaires (Business is business)
Best Supporting Actor - Darry Cowl in On purge bébé (Baby's Laxative) and Feu la mère de Madame (Madame's Late Mother)
Best Actress - Suzanne Flon in La Chambre d'amis
Best Supporting Actress - Catherine Frot in Un air de famille
Best Newcomer - Didier Bezace in La Femme changée en renard
Best Show in an Independent theatre - "Art" at the Comédie des Champs-Élysées
Best Show in a National theatre - Les Affaires sont les affaires (Business is business) at La Limmousine
Best Musical - Les Années Twist at the Folies Bergère
Best Adaptation of a Foreign Play - Jean-Claude Grumberg for Encore une histoire d'amour
Best Playwright - Yasmina Reza for "Art"
Best Director - Alain Françon for Pièces de guerre (The War Plays)
Best Costumes - Michel Dussarat for Chantecler
Best Stage Design/Set - Claude Plet for Les Affaires sont les affaires (Business is business)
Best Author - Yasmina Reza for "Art"

1996
Jury presided by.  Awards hosted by.
Best Actor - Didier Sandre in Un mari idéal (An Ideal Husband)
Best Supporting Actor - Jean-Paul Roussillon in Colombe (Mademoiselle Colombe)
Best Actress - Christiane Cohendy in Décadence
Best Supporting Actress - Sonia Vollereaux in Lapin, lapin
Best Newcomer - Nathalie Cerda in Piaf, je t'aime
Best Show in an Independent theatre - Monsieur Schpill et Monsieur Tippeton by La Compagnie Eroc
Best Show in a National theatre - Un mari idéal (An Ideal Husband) at the Théâtre Antoine
Best Musical - Chimère by Théâtre Zingaro
Best Adaptation of a Foreign Play - Jean-Michel Déprats for L'Importance d'être Constant (The Importance of Being Earnest)
Best Playwright - Gilles Segal for Monsieur Schpill et Monsieur Tippeton
Best Director - Patrice Chéreau for Dans la solitude des champs de coton
Best Costumes - Christian Lacroix for Phèdre
Best Stage Design/Set - Jacques Noël for Noël chez les Cupiello

1997
Jury presided by.  Awards hosted by.
Best Actor - Pierre Cassignard in Les Jumeaux vénitiens (The Two Venetian Twins)
Best Supporting Actor - Robert Hirsch in En attendant Godot (Waiting for Godot)
Best Actress - Myriam Boyer in Qui a peur de Virginia Woolf? (Who's Afraid of Virginia Woolf?)
Best Supporting Actress - Dominique Blanchar in Tout comme il faut
Best Newcomer - Sandrine Kiberlain in Le Roman de Lulu
Best Show : New Play -  Kinkali at the Théâtre national de la Colline
Best Show : Classical Play - Les Jumeaux vénitiens (The Two Venetian Twins) at the Théâtre de la Criée
Best Musical - Le Passe-muraille at the Théâtre Montansier and at the Théâtre des Bouffes-Parisiens
Best Adaptation of a Foreign Play - Jean Piat for L'Affrontement
Best Playwright - Arnaud Bédouet for Kinkali
Best Director - Alain Sachs for Le Passe-muraille
Best Costumes - Dominique Borg for Le Libertin (The Libertine)
Best Stage Design/Set - Guy-Claude François for Le Passe-muraille (The Man Who Walked Through Walls)
Best Comedy - Accalmies passagères (Communicating Doors) by Alan Ayckbourn

1998
Jury presided by Dario Fo. Awards hosted by.
Best Actor - Michel Bouquet in Les Côtelettes
Best Supporting Actor - Maurice Barrier in Douze hommes en colère (Twelve Angry Men)
Best Male Newcomer - Nicolas Vaude in Château en Suède (Château in Sweden) and Michel Vuillermoz in André le Magnifique
Best Actress - Dominique Blanc in Une maison de poupée (A Doll's House)
Best Supporting Actress - Geneviève Casile in Bel-Ami (Bel Ami)
Best Female Newcomer - Isabelle Candelier in André le Magnifique
Best Show : new play - André le magnifique at the Théâtre Tristan-Bernard
Best Show : classical play - Les Fourberies de Scapin at the Comédie-Française
Best Musical - Le Quatuor, il pleut des cordes at the Théâtre du Palais-Royal
Best Adaptation of a Foreign Play - Attica Guedj and Stéphan Meldegg for Pop-corn (Popcorn)
Best Playwright - Isabelle Candelier, Loïc Houdre, Patrick Ligardes, Denis Podalydes and Michel Vuillermoz for André le magnifique
Best Director - Jean-Louis Benoît for Les Fourberies de Scapin
Best Costumes - Jean-Marc Stehlé for Le Roi cerf
Best Stage Design/Set - Jean-Marc Stehlé for Le Roi cerf

1999
Jury presided by Pierre Arditi. Awards hosted by.
Best Actor - Robert Hirsch in Le Bel Air de Londres (London Assurance)
Best Supporting Actor - Michel Aumont in Rêver peut-être
Best Male Newcomer - Denis Podalydes in Le Revizor (The Government Inspector)
Best Actress - Isabelle Carré in Mademoiselle Else
Best Supporting Actress - Geneviève Fontanel in Délicate Balance
Best Female Newcomer - Marie-Christine Orry dans L'Atelier (The Workshop)
Best Show : New Play - Copenhague (Copenhagen) by Michael Frayn at the Théâtre Montparnasse
Best Show : Classical Play - L'Atelier (The Workshop) at the Théâtre Hébertot
Best Musical - L'Ultima Récital at the Théâtre Mogador
Best one man show - Philippe Avron for Je suis un saumon at the Théâtre Rive Gauche
Best Comedy - Après la pluie at the Théâtre de Poche Montparnasse
Best Adaptation of a Foreign Play - Jean-Marie Besset for Copenhague (Copenhagen)
Best Playwright - Jean-Claude Grumberg for L'Atelier (The Workshop)
Best Director - Gildas Bourdet for L'Atelier (The Workshop)
Best Costumes - Pascale Bordet for Mademoiselle Else
Best Stage Design/Set - Jean-Marc Stehlé for Rêver peut-être
Honorary Molière : Vittorio Gassman and Arthur Miller

2000
Jury presided by Suzanne Flon.  Awards hosted by.
Best Actor - Michel Aumont in Un sujet de roman
Best Supporting Actor - Marcel Cuvelier in Mon père avait raison
Best Male Newcomer - Christian Hecq in La Main passe
Best Actress - Judith Magre in Shirley
Best Supporting Actress - Dominique Blanchar in Les Femmes savantes
Best Female Newcomer - Irina Brook for Résonnances
Best Show : New Play - Tambours sur la digue at the Théâtre du Soleil
Best Show : Classical Play - Le Révizor (The Government Inspector) at the Comédie-Française
Best Musical - Peines de coeur d'une chatte française at the MC 93
Best Comical Play Mort accidentelle d'un anarchiste (Accidental Death of an Anarchist) at the Théâtre La Bruyère
Best One Man Show - Arturo Brachetti for L'Homme aux mille visages (The Man With a Thousand Faces)
Best Adaptation of a Foreign Play - Valérie Tasca for Mort accidentelle d'un anarchiste (Accidental Death of an Anarchist)
Best Playwright - Dario Fo for Mort accidentelle d'un anarchiste (Accidental Death of an Anarchist)
Best Director - Ariane Mnouchkine for Tambours sur la digue
Best Costumes - Chloé Obolensky for Peines de coeur d'une chatte française
Best Stage Design/Set - Guy-Claude François for Tambours sur la digue
Honorary Molière : Raymond Devos, Hubert Gignoux, Charles Trénet and the Théâtre de la Huchette

2001
Jury presided by Robert Hossein.  Awards hosted by.
Best Actor - Simon Abkarian in Une bête sur la lune (Beast on the Moon)
Best Supporting Actor - Georges Wilson in Une chatte sur un toit brûlant (Cat on a Hot Tin Roof)
Best Male Newcomer - Édouard Baer in Cravate Club
Best Actress - Corinne Jaber in Une bête sur la lune (Beast on the Moon)
Best Supporting Actress - Annick Alane in Une chatte sur un toit brûlant (Cat on a Hot Tin Roof)
Best Female Newcomer - Barbara Schulz in Joyeuses Pâques
Best Show : New Play - : Les Directeurs at the Théâtre de Poche Montparnasse
Best Show : Classical Play - Une chatte sur un toit brûlant (Cat on a Hot Tin Roof)
Best Musical - Chantons sous la pluie (Singin' in the Rain) at the Théâtre de la Porte Saint-Martin
Best Comedy - Ladies Night at the Théâtre Rive Gauche
Best One-Man Show - Valérie Lemercier  at the Folies Bergère
Best Adaptation of a Foreign Play - Daniel Loayza pour Une bête sur la lune (Beast on the Moon)
Best Playwright - Daniel Besse pour Les Directeurs
Best Director - Irina Brook pour Une bête sur la lune (Beast on the Moon)
Best Costume Design - Ezio Toffolutti pour Le Cercle de craie caucasien (The Caucasian Chalk Circle)
Best Stage Design/Set - Ezio Toffolutti pour Le Cercle de craie caucasien (The Caucasian Chalk Circle)
Best Lighting Design - André Diot for Le Cercle de craie caucasien (The Caucasian Chalk Circle)
Honorary Molière - Madeleine Robinson

2002
Jury presided by Jean Piat.  Awards hosted by.
Best Actor - Jean-Paul Roussillon in Le Jardin des apparences
Best Supporting Actor - Maurice Chevit in Conversations avec mon père (Conversations with my Father)
Best Male Newcomer - Eric Elmosnino in Léonce et Léna
Best Actress - Annie Girardot in Madame Marguerite
Best Supporting Actress - Annie Gregorio in Théâtre sans animaux
Best Female Newcomer - Rachida Brakni in Ruy Blas
Best Show - New play - La Boutique au coin de la rue (The Shop Around the Corner) at the Théâtre Montparnasse
Best Show - Classical play -  Bent at the Théâtre de l'Œuvre
Best Comedy - Théâtre sans animaux at the Théâtre Tristan-Bernard
Best One Man Show - Philippe Avron in Le Fantôme de Shakespeare
Best Musical - Frou-Frou les Bains at the Théâtre Daunou
Best Adaptation of a Foreign Play - Evelyne Fallot and Jean-Jacques Zilbermann for La Boutique au coin de la rue (The Shop Around the Corner)
Best Playwright - Jean-Michel Ribes for Théâtre sans animaux
Best Director - Jean-Jacques Zilbermann for La Boutique au coin de la rue (The Shop Around the Corner)
Best Costumes - Pascale Bordet for Le Dindon (Sauce for the Goose)
Best Lighting Design - Jacques Rouveyrollis pour La Boutique au coin de la rue (The Shop Around the Corner)
Best Stage Design/Set - Stéfanie Jarre for La Boutique au coin de la rue (The Shop Around the Corner)
Honorary Molière - Annie Girardot, Simone Valère and Jean Desailly

2003
Jury presided by Jean Piat.  Awards hosted by Jean Piat.
Best Actor - Thierry Fortineau in Gros-Câlin
Best Supporting Actor - Michel Duchaussoy in Phèdre
Best Male Newcomer - Marc Fayet in Un petit jeu sans conséquence
Best Actress - Danielle Darrieux in Oscar et la dame rose (Oscar and the Lady in Pink)
Best Supporting Actress - Annie Sinigalia in Poste restante (A Song at Twilight)
Best Female Newcomer - Valérie Karsenty in Un petit jeu sans conséquence
Best Show in an Independent theatre - Un petit jeu sans conséquence at the Théâtre La Bruyère
Best Show in a National theatre - Phèdre at the Théâtre de l'Odéon-Ateliers Berthier
Best French New Play - Un petit jeu sans conséquence at the Théâtre La Bruyère
Best Musical - Le Quatuor, sur la corde rêve
Best One Man Show - Shirley et Dino for Shirley & Dino - Le duo
Best Adaptation of a Foreign Play - Pascale de Boysson for Le Regard at the Théâtre Rive Gauche
Best Playwright - Victor Haïm for Jeux de scène
Best Director - Stéphane Hillel for Un petit jeu sans conséquence
Best Costumes - Christian Gasc for L'Éventail de Lady Windermere  (Lady Windermere's Fan)
Best Stage Design/Set - Gérard Stehlé for L'Enfant do
Best Lighting Design - Dominique Brugière for Phèdre
Honorary Molière - Gisèle Casadesus

2004
Jury presided by.  Awards hosted by.
Best Actor - Dominique Pinon in L'Hiver sous la table
Best Supporting Actor - Thierry Frémont in Signé Dumas
Best Male Newcomer - Xavier Gallais in Roberto Zucco
Best Actress - Isabelle Carré in L'Hiver sous la table
Best Supporting Actress - Martine Sarcey in L'Inscription
Best Female Newcomer - Marie Vincent in ...Comme en 14 !
Best Show in an Independent theatre - L'Hiver sous la table at the Théâtre de l'Atelier
Best Show in a National theatre -  ...Comme en 14 ! at the Théâtre 13/Pépinière Opéra
Best French New Play - ...Comme en 14 ! at the Théâtre 13/Pépinière Opéra
Best Comedy - L'Amour est enfant de salaud (Things We Do for Love) by Alan Ayckbourn at the Théâtre Tristan-Bernard
Best Adaptation of a Foreign Play - Michel Blanc for L'Amour est enfant de salaud (Things We Do For Love)
Best Playwright - Denise Bonal for Portrait de famille
Best Director - Zabou Breitman for L'Hiver sous la table
Best Costumes - Moidele Bickel for Les Fables de la Fontaine
Best Stage Design/Set - Jacques Gabel for L'Hiver sous la table
Best Lighting Design - André Diot for L'Hiver sous la table

2005
Jury presided by.  Awards hosted by Laurent Ruquier and William Leymergie.
Best Actor - Michel Bouquet in Le roi se meurt (Exit the King)
Best Supporting Actor - Maurice Chevit in Brooklyn Boy
Best Male Newcomer - Micha Lescot in Musée haut, musée bas
Best Actress - Christine Murillo in Dis à ma fille que je pars en voyage
Best Supporting Actress - Norah Krief in Hedda Gabler
Best Female Newcomer - Emmanuelle Bougerol in Les Muses orphelines
Best Show in an Independent theatre - Le roi se meurt (Exit the King) at the Théâtre Hébertot
Best Show in a National theatre - Le Dernier Caravansérail at the Théâtre du Soleil
Best Music - Jean-Jacques Lemètre for Le Dernier Caravansérail
Best Adaptation of a Foreign Play - Séverine Magois and Didier Bezace for La Version de Browning (The Browning Version)
Best Playwright - Wajdi Mouawad pour Littoral
Best Director - Didier Bezace for La Version de Browning (The Browning Version)
Best Costumes - Alain Chambon for Le Menteur (The Liar)
Best Stage Design/Set - Serge Nicolaï, Duccio Bellugi-Vannuccini and Guy-Claude François for Le Dernier Caravansérail
Best Lighting Design - André Diot for Le Jugement dernier

2006
Jury presided by Jacques Weber.  Awards hosted by Karine Le Marchand.
Best Actor - Jacques Sereys in Du côté de chez Proust
Best Supporting Actor - Roger Dumas Moins 2
Best Male Newcomer - James Thiérrée in La Symphonie du hanneton (The Junebug Symphony)
Best Actress - Judith Magre in Histoires d'hommes
Best Supporting Actress - Danièle Lebrun in Pygmalion
Best Female Newcomer - Marilou Berry in Toc Toc
Best Show in an Independent theatre - Moi aussi, je suis Catherine Deneuve at the Pépinière Opéra
Best Show in a National theatre - La Symphonie du hanneton (The Junebug Symphony) at the Théâtre du Rond-Point
Best Musical - Le Jazz et la Diva at the Théâtre Tristan-Bernard
Best Adaptation of a Foreign Play - André Markowicz and Françoise Morvan for Platonov
Best Playwright - Stéphan Wojtowicz for La Sainte Catherine
Best Director - James Thiérrée for La Symphonie du hanneton (The Junebug Symphony)
Best Costumes - Victoria Chaplin Thiérrée for La Symphonie du hanneton
Best Stage Design/Set - Nicky Rieti for Le Roi Lear (King Lear)
Best Lighting Design - André Diot for Le Roi Lear (King Lear)

2007
Jury presided by Jacques Weber.  Awards hosted by Karine Le Marchand.
Best Actor - Robert Hirsch in Le Gardien (The Caretaker)
Best Supporting Actor - Éric Ruf in Cyrano de Bergerac
Best Male Newcomer - Julien Cottereau in Imagine-toi
Best Actress - Martine Chevallier in Le Retour au désert (Return to the Desert)
Best Supporting Actress - Catherine Hiegel in Le Retour au désert (Return to the Desert)
Best Female Newcomer - Sara Giraudeau in La Valse des pingouins
Best Show in an Independent theatre - Le Gardien (The Caretaker) at the Théâtre de l'Œuvre
Best Show in a National theatre - Cyrano de Bergerac at the Comédie-Française
Best Musical - Le Cabaret des hommes perdus at the Théâtre du Rond-Point and at the Pépinière Opéra
Best One Man Show - Michel Aumont in À la porte
Best Adaptation of a Foreign Play - Marcel Bluwal for À la porte
Best Playwright - Christian Siméon for Le Cabaret des hommes perdus
Best Director - Denis Podalydès for Cyrano de Bergerac
Best Costumes - Christian Lacroix for Cyrano de Bergerac
Best Stage Design/Set - Éric Ruf for Cyrano de Bergerac
Best Lighting Design - Stéphanie Daniel for Cyrano de Bergerac

2008
Jury presided by Clovis Cornillac and Barbara Schulz  Awards hosted by Karine Le Marchand
Best Actor - Michel Galabru in Les Chaussettes - opus 124
Best Supporting Actor - Gilles Privat in L'Hôtel du libre échange
Best Actress - Myriam Boyer in La Vie devant soi
Best Supporting Actress - Valérie Bonneton in Le Dieu du carnage
Best Newcomer - Raphaëline Goupilleau in Une souris verte
Best Show in an Independent theatre - La Vie devant soi at the Théâtre Marigny
Best Show in a National theatre - Juste la fin du monde at the Comédie-Française
Best Musical - Le Roi Lion (The Lion King)
Best Adaptation - Xavier Jaillard for La Vie devant soi
Best Playwright -  for Les Diablogues
Best Director - John Malkovich for Good Canary
Best Costumes - Julie Taymor Le Roi Lion (The Lion King)
Best Stage Design/Set - Pierre-Francois Limbosch pour Good Canary

2009
Jury presided by Bernard Giraudeau Awards hosted by Frédéric Mitterrand
Best Actor - Patrick Chesnais in Cochons d'Inde
Best Supporting Actor - Roland Bertin in Coriolan
Best Male Newcomer - David Lescot in La Commission centrale de l'enfance
Best Actress - Anne Alvaro in Gertrude (le cri) (Gertrude (The Cry))
Best Supporting Actress - Monique Chaumette in Baby Doll
Best Female Newcomer - Aude Briant in Le Journal à quatre mains
Best Show in an Independent theatre - Des Gens at the Théâtre Montparnasse
Best Show in a National theatre - Coriolan at the Théâtre national populaire
Best Musical - L'Opéra de Sarah - avant l'Amérique at the Théâtre de l'Œuvre
Best Adaptation of a Foreign Play - Zabou Breitman for Des gens
Best Playwright - Jean-Claude Grumberg for Vers toi terre promise
Best Director - Christian Schiaretti for Coriolan
Best Costumes - Claire Risterucci for Madame de Sade
Best Stage Design/Set - Catherine Bluwal for Le Diable rouge

2010
Jury presided by Line Renaud Awards hosted by Michel Drucker and Marie Drucker
Best Actor - Laurent Terzieff in L'Habilleur (The Dresser) and Philoctète (Philoctetes)
Best Supporting Actor - Henri Courseaux in La Nuit des rois (Twelfth Night)
Best Male Newcomer - Guillaume Gallienne in Les garçons et Guillaume, à table !
Best Actress - Dominique Blanc in La Douleur
Best Supporting Actress - Claire Nadeau in La Serva amorosa (The Loving Maid)
Best Female Newcomer - Alice Belaïdi in Confidences à Allah
Best Show in an Independent theatre - L'Habilleur (The Dresser) at the Théâtre Rive Gauche
Best Show in a National theatre - Les Naufragés du fol espoir at the Théâtre du Soleil
Best Show for Young People - Oh Boy! at the Théâtre du Phare
Best Musical - Les Douze Pianos d'Hercule by the Compagnie des Claviers
Best Comedy - Les 39 marches at the Théâtre La Bruyère
Best Adaptation of a Foreign Play - Gérald Sibleyras for Les 39 marches (The 39 Steps)
Best Playwright - Éric Assous for L'Illusion conjugale
Best Director - Alain Françon for La Cerisaie (The Cherry Orchard)
Best Costumes - Nathalie Thomas, Marie-Hélène Bouvet, Annie Tran for Les Naufragés du Fol Espoir
Best Stage Design/Set - Catherine Bluwal for La Serva amorosa (The Loving Maid)
Best Lighting Design - Gaëlle de Malglaive for La Nuit des rois (Twelfth Night)

2011
Jury presided by Michel Galabru. Awards hosted by Laurent Lafitte
Best Actor - Christian Hecq in Un fil à la patte (A Fly in the Ointment)
Best Supporting Actor - Guillaume Gallienne in Un fil à la patte (A Fly in the Ointment)
Best Male Newcomer - Guillaume Marquet in Le Dindon (Sauce for the Goose)
Best Actress - Catherine Hiegel in La Mère
Best Supporting Actress - Bulle Ogier in Rêve d'automne (Autumn Dream)
Best Female Newcomer - Georgia Scalliet in Les Trois Sœurs (Three Sisters)
Best Show in an Independent theatre - Le Repas des fauves  at the Théâtre Michel
Best Show in a National theatre - Un fil à la patte (A Fly in the Ointment) at the Comédie-Française
Best Musical - Une flûte enchantée at the Théâtre des Bouffes du Nord
Best Comedy - Thé à la menthe ou t'es citron at the Théâtre Fontaine
Best Adaptation - Julien Sibre for Le Repas des fauves
Best Playwright - Joël Pommerat for Ma chambre froide
Best Director - Julien Sibre for Le Repas des fauves
Best Costumes - Jean-Daniel Vuillermoz for Henri IV, le bien aimé
Best Stage Design/Set - Richard Peduzzi for Rêve d'automne (Autumn Dream)
Best Lighting Design - Dominique Bruguière pour Rêve d'automne (Autumn Dream)
Honorary Molière - Peter Brook

2016
Best Show in a Public Theatre: Ça ira (1) Fin de Louis, directed by Joël Pommerat, Théâtre Nanterre-Amandiers
Best Show in an Private Theatre: Les Cavaliers, after Joseph Kessel, directed by Eric Bouvron and Anne Bourgeois, Théâtre La Bruyère
Best Actor in a Public Theatre: Charles Berling in Vu du Pont (A View from the Bridge) by Arthur Miller, directed by Ivo Van Hove
Best Actor in a Private Theatre: Wladimir Yordanoff in Who's Afraid of Virginia Woolf? by Edward Albee, directed by Alain Françon
Best Actress in a Public Theatre: Dominique Blanc in Les Liaisons Dangereuses by Pierre Choderlos de Laclos, directed by Christine Letailleur
Best Actress in a Private Theatre: Catherine Frot in Fleur de Cactus by Pierre Barillet and Jean-Pierre Gredy, directed by Michel Fau
Best Supporting Actor: Didier Brice in A tort et à raison (Taking Sides) by Ronald Harwood, directed by Georges Werler
Best Supporting Actress: Anne Bouvier in King Lear by William Shakespeare, directed by Jean-Luc Revol
Best Male Newcomer: Alexis Moncorgé in Amok by Stefan Zweig, directed by Caroline Darnay
Best Female Newcomer: Géraldine Martineau in Le poisson Belge by Léonore Confino, directed by Catherine Schaub
Best Musical: Les Fiancés de Loches by Georges Feydeau and Maurice Desvallières, directed by Hervé Devolder, Théâtre du Palais-Royal
Best Comedy: Les Faux British (The Play That Goes Wrong) by Henry Lewis, Jonathan Sayer and Henry Shields, directed by Gwen Aduh, Théâtre Tristan Bernard
Best Show for Young Audiences: Pinocchio, adapted and directed by Joël Pommerat, Théâtre de l'Odéon
Best Solo Show: Les Chatouilles ou la danse de la colère, by Andréa Bescond, directed by Éric Métayer
Best Living Francophone Playwright: Joël Pommerat for Ça ira (1) Fin de Louis
Best Director in a Public Theatre: Joël Pommerat for Ça ira (1) Fin de Louis by Joël Pommerat
Best Director in a Private Theatre: Alain Françon for Who's Afraid of Virginia Woolf? by Edward Albee
Best Humour: Alex Lutz, Alex Lutz and Tom Dingler, directed by Tom Dingler
Best Visual Creation: 20 000 lieues sous les mers (20,000 leagues under the sea), after Jules Verne, directed by Christian Hecq and Valérie Lesort, Theater of the Vieux-Colombier. Scenography and costumes: Eric Ruf. Lights: Pascal Laajili. Puppets: Carole German and Valérie Lesort

References

External links
 Official website 

Molière
Awards established in 1987
1987 establishments in France
French theatre awards